Belfort (archaic) is a city in the Bourgogne-Franche-Comté region in Northeastern France, situated between Lyon and Strasbourg, approximately  from the France–Switzerland border. It is the prefecture of the Territoire de Belfort department.

The residents of the city are called "Belfortains". The city is located on the river Savoureuse, on a strategically important natural route between the Rhine and the Rhône – the Belfort Gap (Trouée de Belfort) or Burgundian Gate (Porte de Bourgogne). The city of Belfort has 46,443 inhabitants (2019). Belfort is the centre of a larger functional area (metropolitan area) with 133,597 inhabitants (2018), between the larger metropolitan areas of Mulhouse and Montbéliard.

History 

Belfort's strategic location, in a natural gap between the Vosges and the Jura, on a route linking the Rhine and the Rhône, has attracted human settlement since Roman times, and has also made it a frequent target for invading armies many times in its history.

The site of Belfort was inhabited in Gallo-Roman times. Later, it was heavily settled by Germanic peoples during the Germanic migrations, most notably the Burgundians, who settled in the region after the Gallo-Roman inhabitants had been displaced. It was subsequently recorded in the 13th century as a possession of the counts of Montbéliard, who granted it a charter in 1307.

Previously an Austrian possession, Belfort was transferred to France by the Treaty of Westphalia (1648), which ended the Thirty Years' War. The town's fortifications were extended and developed by the military architect Vauban for Louis XIV.

Franco-Prussian War
Until 1871, Belfort was part of the département of Haut-Rhin, in Alsace. The Siege of Belfort (between 3 November 1870 and 18 February 1871) during the Franco Prussian war was successfully resisted by the French until the garrison was ordered to surrender 21 days after the armistice between France and Prussia ended the war. The region was not annexed by Prussia like the rest of Alsace was. It was exchanged for territories in the vicinity of Metz. It formed, as it still does, the Territoire de Belfort. The siege is commemorated by a huge statue, the Lion of Belfort, by Frédéric Bartholdi. Alsatians not wanting to live under German rule in annexed Alsace and who wanted a French life and home in Belfort made a significant contribution to Belfort and French industry (see Société Alsacienne de Constructions Mécaniques) after 1872.

World War One
The town was bombarded by the German Army during World War I. Before the war, the September Programme of German Imperial Chancellor Theobald von Bethmann Hollweg, pressed for expansionist aims of French territory, specifically advocated the annexation of the Belfort region along with the western side of the Vosges Mountains.

World War Two
After the 1940 Battle of France with the German victory, Belfort fell within the Nazi German occupation zone. In November 1944, the retreating Wehrmacht held off the French First Army outside the town until French Commandos made a successful night attack on the Salbert Fort. Belfort was liberated on 22 November 1944. It is believed that Adolf Hitler intended to annex Belfort into the German Gau Baden–Alsace, but it never took place.

1892 Paris-Belfort running race
Over 1,100 competitors registered for the event and over 800 started from the offices of Le Petit Journal, at Paris Opera. This had also been the start point for the inaugural Paris–Brest–Paris cycle-race the previous year. The newspaper's circulation dramatically increased as the French public followed the progress of race participants, 380 of whom completed the course in under ten days. In Le Petit Journal on 18 June 1892, Pierre Giffard praised the event as a model for the physical training of a nation faced by hostile neighbours. The event was won by Constant Ramoge in 100 hours, 5 minutes.

Geography

Climate
Belfort has a oceanic climate (Köppen climate classification Cfb).

Population

Economy 
Belfort is a centre for heavy engineering industries, mostly dedicated to railways and turbines. Belfort is the hometown of Alstom where the first TGVs (Trains à Grande Vitesse, High Speed Trains) were produced, as well as hosting the GE Power European headquarters and a centre of excellence for the manufacturing of gas turbines.

Transport

Road
Like many other European cities, the volume of road traffic in Belfort continues to increases and dominates transport. Belfort is situated at only  from the commercial port of Mulhouse-Rhin which allows international trade. The motorway A36 from Beaune to Mulhouse follows a route to the south and east of the city, and forms the main axis linking Belfort to other French and European cities. N19 is another major route which joins the south of Belfort with Paris, Nancy and Switzerland.

Air

Rail links 

Belfort is well connected with the rest of France, with direct connections by train to major destinations such as Paris, Dijon, Besançon, Mulhouse, Strasbourg, Lyon, Marseille, Montpellier and Lille, including high-speed trains. Some trains operate into Switzerland, such as Basel and Zürich stations. There is also a train service to Frankfurt am Main in Germany.

Regional services connect Belfort to Montbéliard, Besançon, Mulhouse, Vesoul, Épinal and Nancy.

Belfort station is the main railway station in the centre of the city.

From 2017, regional trains will connect Belfort with Belfort-Montbéliard TGV station using the new Belfort–Delle railway link. This service links Belfort and the surrounding area to Switzerland, and the high-speed train link will connect Swiss towns such as Delémont, Bern, Fribourg and Lausanne to Paris and other cities. Before 2020, the service Épinal-Belfort will be electrified and modernized. This will allow a link between LGV Est and LGV Rhin-Rhône in Belfort-Montbéliard TGV station, opening new destinations like Nancy, Metz and Luxembourg.

Local transport 

A local bus network Optymo operates within Belfort (www.optymo.fr). Tickets can be bought from any newsagent in the city, or a bus passenger can send a sms 'BUS' to 84100 and show the confirmation sms as a ticket.

Cycling tracks 

There are many organised cycling events, offering the opportunity for people to explore the area in the company of an official guide.

Sights 

 Belfort is the home of the Lion of Belfort, a sculpture (that expressed people's resistance against the siege in the Franco-Prussian War (1870)) by Frédéric Bartholdi – who shortly afterwards built the Statue of Liberty in New York.
 The Belfort Citadel – A unique example of Vauban pentagonal fortifications
 The Belfort Cathedral, 18th century
 The Belfort Synagogue erected in 1857
 The old town
 The Belfort city museums feature three main areas:
 History (from archeology to military) in the old barracks on the top of the citadel.
 Art (mainly from 16th to 19th century) in the Tour 41
 Modern Art in the Donation Jardot
 Since July 2007, the site of "La Citadelle de la Liberté", the citadel of Liberty has been open to the public – with a son et lumière animated trail in the moats and its big underground passage.
 From the top of a tall building or going up the nearby mountains on a clear day, the ice-capped mountains of the Alps in Switzerland can be seen.
 Grand souterrain de la citadelle de Belfort- the underground passage of Belfort Citadel.

Culture

Eurockéennes 
Belfort's best known cultural event is the annual Eurockéennes, one of France's largest rock music festivals.

FIMU 

Belfort is also well known for hosting the annual Festival International de Musique Universitaire (FIMU) held in May each year. FIMU usually involves over 250 concerts at different locations around the city and around 2500 musicians, most of them students or amateur groups from countries across Europe and the rest of the world. Music styles performed are extremely diverse and include traditional, folk, rock, jazz, classical and experimental.

Personalities

Births 
Belfort was the birthplace of:
 Joseph de La Porte (1714–1779), 18th-century Jesuit, literary critic, poet and playwright.
 Marie-Anne Françoise Brideau (1751–1794), Carmelite nun (Sœur Saint Louis), one of the sixteen Martyrs of Compiègne
 François Sébastien Christophe Laporte (1760–1823), French Revolutionary politician 
 François Joseph Heim (1787–1865), painter
 Marie-Anne Leroudier (1838-1908), embroiderer
 Jules Brunet (1838–1911), a member of the first French Military Mission to Japan in order to help modernize the armies of the shogunate
 Alexander Toponce (1839–1923), American pioneer
 Louis-Gabriel-Charles Vicaire (1848–1900), poet
 Paul Faivre (1886–1973), actor
 Pierre Macherey (1938– ), literary critic
 Jean-Pierre Chevènement (1939– ), politician
 Raymond Forni (1941–2008), politician
 Gérard Grisey (born 1946–1998), composer
 Tahar Rahim (1981– ), actor
 Thomas Holbein (1983– ), professional footballer
 Frederic Duplus, footballer
 John Glele, footballer
 Catherine Joly, classical pianist
 Fabrice Balanche, geographer

International relations 

Belfort is twinned with:

 Delémont, Switzerland
 Leonberg, Germany
 Zaporizhzhia, Ukraine
 Stafford, England, United Kingdom
 Tanghin-Dassouri, Burkina Faso

See also 
Communes of the Territoire de Belfort department
Fortified region of Belfort
The works of Antonin Mercié

References

External links 

 City council website  
 La place forte de Belfort 1870–1914 
 Tourist office website
 Visiting Belfort
 Webpage about the fortifications 
 Léon Delarbre 
 Georges Vérez. Sculptor of Belfort War Memorial.

 
Communes of the Territoire de Belfort
Prefectures in France
Territoire de Belfort communes articles needing translation from French Wikipedia
Vauban fortifications in France